Lake Station is an unincorporated community in Buchanan County, in the U.S. state of Missouri.

The community takes its name from nearby Lake Contrary.

References

Unincorporated communities in Buchanan County, Missouri
Unincorporated communities in Missouri